Catherine Clément (born 10 February 1939) is a French philosopher, novelist, feminist, and literary critic, born in Boulogne-Billancourt. She received a degree in philosophy from the École Normale Supérieure, and studied under its faculty Claude Lévi-Strauss and Jacques Lacan, working in the fields of anthropology and psychoanalysis. A member of the school of French feminism and écriture féminine, she has published books with Hélène Cixous and Julia Kristeva.

She lived many years overseas, as her husband, André Lewin (1934–2012), was a diplomat who was France's Ambassador to India, Austria, Guinea, Gambia and Senegal. She was awarded the Grand Officer of the Ordre national du Mérite in 2012 and the Commander of the Legion of Honour in 2017.

Bibliography

Novels
 Bildoungue ou la vie de Freud, Christian Bourgois, 1978
 La Sultane, Grasset, 1981
 Le Maure de Venise, Grasset, 1983
 Bleu Panique, Grasset, 1986
 Adrienne Lecouvreur ou le cœur transporté, Robert Laffont, 1991, (reissue: J'ai lu n°3957)
 La Señora, Calmann-Lévy (reissue: LGF-Livre de Poche n°8717)
 Pour l'amour de l'Inde, Flammarion, J'ai Lu, 1993
 La valse inachevée, Calmann-Lévy, 1994 (reissue: Le Livre de Poche n°13942)
 La Putain du diable, Flammarion, 1996 (reissue: J'ai Lu n°4839)
 Le Roman du Taj Mahal, Noésis, 1997
 Les Dames de l'agave, Flammarion, 1998
 Le Voyage de Théo, Seuil, 1998 (Points Seuil n°P680)
 Martin et Hannah, Calmann-Lévy, 1999 (reissue: Le Livre de poche n°14798)
 Afrique esclave, Noésis, 1999
 Jésus au bûcher, Seuil, 2000
 Cherche-midi, Stock, 2000 (reissue: Le Livre de poche n°30048)
 Les Mille Romans de Bénarès, Noésis, 2000
 Le Sang du monde, Seuil, 2004, sequel to Voyage de Théo
 Les derniers jours de la déesse, Stock, 2006
 La Princesse mendiante, Panama, 2007 (on the life of Mirabai)
 La Reine des cipayes, Paris: Seuil, 2012,  (on the life of Rani Lakshmibai)
Les Ravissements du Grand Moghol, Seuil, 2016
Indu Boy, Seuil, 2018

Essays
Lévi-Strauss ou la Structure et le malheur, Seghers, 1re édition en 1970, 2e édition en 1974,
dernière édition entièrement remaniée Le Livre de poche, « Biblio essais », 1985
 Le Pouvoir des mots, Mame, « Repères sciences humaines », 1974
 Miroirs du sujet, 10/18, série « Esthétiques », 1975
 "La Jeune Née", with Hélène Cixous U.G.E., 1975
 Les fils de Freud sont fatigués, Grasset, « Figures », 1978
 L'Opéra ou la Défaite des femmes, Grasset, « Figures », 1979
 Vies et légendes de Jacques Lacan, Grasset, « Figures », 1981, et Le Livre de poche, « Biblio essais », 1983
 Rêver chacun pour l'autre essai sur la politique culturelle, Fayard, 1982
 Le Goût du miel, Grasset, « Figures », 1987
 Gandhi : Athlète de la liberté, collection « Découvertes Gallimard » (nº 50), série Histoire. Paris: Gallimard, 1989, 2 édition, 1990, new edition in 2008
 Gandhi: Father of a Nation, 'New Horizons' series. London: Thames & Hudson, 1996
 Gandhi: The Power of Pacifism, "Abrams Discoveries" series. New York: Harry N. Abrams, 1996
 La Syncope, philosophie du ravissement, Grasset, « Figures », 1990
 La Pègre, la peste et les dieux, chroniques du Festival d'Avignon, Éditions théâtrales, 1991
 Sissi : L'impératrice anarchiste, collection « Découvertes Gallimard » (nº 148), série Histoire. Paris: Gallimard, 1992
 Sollers, la fronde, Julliard, 1995
 Les Révolutions de l'inconscient : histoire et géographie des maladies de l'âme, La Martinière, 2001
"Le Divan et le Grigri" + Tobie Nathan, Odile Jacob, 1998
 Claude Lévi-Strauss, PUF, « Que sais-je ? », 2003
 La Nuit et l'été : rapport sur la culture à la télévision, Seuil/La Documentation française, 2003
 Pour Sigmund Freud, Mengès, 2005
 Maison mère, NIL, 2006
 Qu'est-ce qu'un peuple premier ?, Panama, « Cyclo », 2006

Journalism
 Literary critic and philosopher for  Le Matin de Paris
 Member of the editorial board of the literary journal L'Arc
 Member of the editorial board of La Nouvelle Critique, a journal of Communist intellectuals
 Member of the editorial board of Opéra International
 Responsible for many issues of Magazine Littéraire

References

External links
 Alliance Française USA page

1939 births
Living people
École Normale Supérieure alumni
French essayists
French literary critics
Women literary critics
French women novelists
French feminists
French women philosophers
Feminist studies scholars
Postmodern feminists
Continental philosophers
20th-century French philosophers
21st-century French philosophers
20th-century French women writers
21st-century French women writers
21st-century French writers
French women essayists
French women critics